Roger Bothe (born January 6, 1988) is an American soccer player.

Career

Youth and college
Bothe grew up in Chester, Virginia, and attended Thomas Dale High School, where he won the Gatorade Virginia High School Player of the Year and VHSCA Group AAA Male Athlete of the Year awards in both 2005 and 2006.

He played college soccer at The College of William & Mary, where he received numerous accolades, including VaSID All-State First Team, All-CAA Second Team, NSCAA All-South Atlantic Region Second Team and Scholar All-American Second Team honors.

Bothe also spent seven years in the Richmond Kickers club youth system, joining the club as a U-15 Elite player in 2002 before graduating to the Richmond Kickers Future USL Premier Development League team in 2006.

Professional
Bothe turned professional in 2010 when he signed with the Richmond Kickers of the USL Second Division, and in doing so became the first player to rise from the youth to the pro ranks within the club. He made his professional debut on April 17, 2010, in a league match against Harrisburg City Islanders. He also taught mathematics at Thurson Middle School in Westwood, MA.

Current 
Bothe is a soccer coach at Wellesley High School in Massachusetts.

References

External links
 William & Mary bio

1988 births
Living people
American soccer players
William & Mary Tribe men's soccer players
Richmond Kickers Future players
Richmond Kickers players
USL League Two players
USL Second Division players
Soccer players from Richmond, Virginia
People from Hampton, Virginia
People from Chester, Virginia
Association football forwards